Seven Mile Creek or Sevenmile Creek is a place name. It may refer to

Communities
Seven Mile Creek, Wisconsin, a town in Juneau County
Lamartine, Wisconsin, formerly called Seven Mile Creek or Seven-Mile-Creek

Streams
Sevenmile Creek (Ohio), in Preble County and Butler counties
Sevenmile Creek (South Dakota)
Sevenmile Creek (Tennessee), a tributary of Mill Creek
Sevenmile Creek (Wisconsin River tributary), a stream in Wisconsin